Abram Samoilovitch Besicovitch (or Besikovitch) (23 January 1891 – 2 November 1970) was a Russian mathematician, who worked mainly in England. He was born in Berdyansk on the Sea of Azov (now in Ukraine) to a Karaite Jewish family.

Life and career
Abram Besicovitch studied under the supervision of Andrey Markov at the St. Petersburg University, graduating with a PhD in 1912. He then began research in probability theory. He converted to Eastern Orthodoxy, joining the Russian Orthodox Church, on marrying in 1916. He was appointed professor at the University of Perm in 1917, and was caught up in the Russian Civil War over the next two years. In 1920 he took a position at the Petrograd University.

In 1924 he went to Copenhagen on a Rockefeller Fellowship, where he worked on almost periodic functions under Harald Bohr. A type of function space in that field now bears his name. After a visit to G.H. Hardy at the University of Oxford, he had appointments at the University of Liverpool in 1926, and the University of Cambridge in 1927.

Besicovitch moved to Cambridge University in 1927. In 1950, he was appointed to the Rouse Ball Chair of Mathematics. In 1958, he retired and toured the US for eight years. After returning to Trinity College Cambridge, he died in 1970. He was appointed Lecturer in the Faculty of Mathematics, and therefore received recognition as a Cambridge MA by 'Special Grace' on 24 November 1928. He worked mainly on combinatorial methods and questions in real analysis, such as the Kakeya needle problem and the Hausdorff–Besicovitch dimension. These two particular areas have proved increasingly important as the years have gone by. The Kovner–Besicovitch measure of the central symmetry of planar convex sets is also named after him.

He was also a major influence on the economist Piero Sraffa, after 1940, when they were both Fellows of Trinity College, Cambridge, and on Dennis Lindley, one of the founders of the Bayesian movement in the United Kingdom. He was J.E. Littlewood's successor in 1950 in the Rouse Ball chair at the University of Cambridge, retiring in 1958. He died in Cambridge.

Awards and honours
Besicovitch was in 1934 made FRS and in 1952 won the Sylvester Medal from the Royal Society. He received in 1950 the De Morgan Medal of the London Mathematical Society. He was a visiting scholar at the Institute for Advanced Study in the fall of 1954.

Besicovitch's candidacy for the Royal Society reads:

The asteroid 16953 Besicovitch is named in his honour.

A portrait of Besicovitch by Eve Goldsmith Coxeter is in the collection of Trinity College, Cambridge.

Quotation
 A mathematician's reputation rests on the number of bad proofs he has given.

References

External links
 
 
Besicovitch’s version of the card game Svoi Kozyri.

1891 births
1970 deaths
People from Berdiansk
People from Taurida Governorate
20th-century Ukrainian mathematicians
20th-century British mathematicians
Jewish scientists
Soviet emigrants to the United Kingdom]
British Jews
Ukrainian Jews
Saint Petersburg State University alumni
Academic staff of Perm State University
Rectors of Perm State University
Fellows of Trinity College, Cambridge
Rouse Ball Professors of Mathematics (Cambridge)
Institute for Advanced Study visiting scholars
Converts to Eastern Orthodoxy from Judaism
Fellows of the Royal Society
Rockefeller Fellows